Heinrich Wydler  was a Swiss botanist (24 April 1800, in Zurich – 6 December 1883, in Gernsbach.) 
He spent the years 1826-27 on a collecting expedition to the West Indies; worked at the St. Petersburg botanical garden in 1828-30;  was curator (keeper) of the de Candolle botanical collections at the University of Geneva (G-DeC), 1830–4. He worked as a teacher in Geneva and Bern and after his marriage in 1840 settled in Strasbourg.

The now defunct genus Wydleria DC. (Apiaceae) was named in his honor.

Complete bibliography
 WorldCat

Sources
 Nordisk Familjebok
 Allgemeine deutsche Biographie
 Urban, Ignaz, Notae Biographicae, Symbolae Antillanae 3:146,1902.

References

Botanists with author abbreviations
1800 births
1883 deaths
19th-century Swiss botanists
Botanists active in the Caribbean